is a railway station in the town of Yamanouchi, Nagano, Japan, operated by the private railway operating company Nagano Electric Railway. Yudanaka Station is a gateway to seasonal mountain and outdoor activities, including hiking and skiing or snowboarding, and to Jigokudani Monkey Park where Japanese macaques soak in an outdoor hot spring.

An indoor Japanese hot spring named  is located in the former station building, standing beside the current station. The former station building itself is registered as tangible cultural property.

At the train's arrival, the song , composed by Akira Nishizawa, Masao Koga, and Atsuo Okamoto plays. On departure, a regular train bell rings.

Lines
Yudanaka Station is the terminus of the Nagano Electric Railway Nagano Line and is 33.2 kilometers from the opposing terminus of the line at Nagano Station. Yudanaka is 1.4 km from Kamijō Station, its nearest station on the local line, and 9.9 km from Shinshūnakano Station, its nearest station on the limited express.

Station layout
The station consists of one ground-level side platform serving a single dead-headed track. The station formerly had two opposed side platforms, but one side platform is no longer in use. The staffed station building includes a station office, waiting room, tourist information center, and automatic ticket machines.

Adjacent stations

Buses

Shirane Kazan bus stop is closed due to an eruption of Mount Kusatsu-Shirane. It is impossible to transfer onto any bus route at Shirane Kazan bus stop with suspension of Nagaden Bus bound for Shirane Kazan.

History
The station opened on 28 April 1927. Two stations were built, two licenses were acquired, but the work to lay the rails never commenced. Those licenses expired in 1931 and in 1958.

In January 1937, a Japanese National Railways (JNR) train arrived for the first time via Nagano Station, and in July of the same year a JNR trained arrived via Yashiro Station.

In 1958, the current station building was completed. In 1971, freight operations ended. JNR operated  the Shiga train between Yudanaka and Ueno Station in Tokyo using the Shinetsu Line. This service to Yudanaka was discontinued in 1982.

In preparation for the 1998 Winter Olympics, there was an effort to rename the station ; however, this was withdrawn due to opposition from the Yudanaka Onsen Association.

In 2004, the former station was registered as tangible cultural property.

In 2006, the last mini switchback lines into the station were removed following repairs.

Between 2010 and 2012, the station was operated by Hokushin Sightseeing Taxi (currently Nagaden Taxi).

Passenger statistics
In fiscal 2016, the station was used by an average of 646 passengers daily (boarding passengers only).

Gallery

Surrounding area
Yudanaka Onsen
Yamanouchi Town Hall
Yamanouchi Middle School
Yudanaka Post Office

See also
 List of railway stations in Japan

References

External links

 

Railway stations in Japan opened in 1927
Railway stations in Nagano Prefecture
Nagano Electric Railway
Yamanouchi, Nagano